Several ships have been named Parnon, after the Greek mountain range, including: 

 , a 724 GRT Greek cargo vessel, converted from the corvette HMS Alisma. She foundered off Italy on 16 July 1954
 , a 7,952 GRT Greek bulk carrier, built as the merchant aircraft carrier Empire MacDermott

Ship names